Walter N. "Ben" Clemons was a basketball, baseball, and football player and coach for the Florida Gators.

Early years
Clemons was a high school teammate of Rainey Cawthon at Leon High School.

Playing career

Football
He was a 195-pound center on the 1928 football team, splitting time with starter Frank Clark. The 1928 Gators were remembered by many sports commentators as the best Florida football team until at least the 1960s. An all-time Florida team selected by George Trevor in 1935 puts Clemons at second-team center, behind Welcome Shearer.

Basketball
Clemons tied as the team's leading scorer in the basketball season of 1929–30 with 136 points. In the 1931 Southern Conference tournament, Clemons was the high scorer in a victory over Georgia Tech. Dale Waters and Monk Dorsett also played both football and basketball with Clemons.

Baseball
Clemons pitched on the baseball team. He was captain of the baseball team in his senior season.

Coaching career
Clemons coached at his alma mater from 1933 to 1936. He was the head coach of both the basketball and baseball teams, and an assistant for the varsity football team. Coach Clemons' basketball team once beat Adolph Rupp's Kentucky Wildcats in the SEC tournament, bringing Clemons to tears.

See also
 List of University of Florida Athletic Hall of Fame members

References

Year of birth missing
Year of death missing
American football centers
Baseball pitchers
Florida Gators baseball coaches
Florida Gators baseball players
Florida Gators football players
Florida Gators men's basketball coaches
Florida Gators men's basketball players
Stetson Hatters baseball coaches
Stetson Hatters football coaches
Stetson Hatters men's basketball coaches
The Citadel Bulldogs basketball coaches
The Citadel Bulldogs football coaches
American men's basketball players
Sportspeople from Tallahassee, Florida
Players of American football from Florida
Baseball players from Florida
Florida Gators football coaches